The Atewa Range Forest Reserve (also called the Atiwa-Atwaredu ranges) is in the Akyem Abuakwa region of southeastern Ghana, near the town of Kibi, and south-west of the Kwahu Plateau which forms the south-west boundary of Lake Volta. The range runs roughly north–south, consisting of steep-sided hills with fairly flat summits. It is the last remains of the Cenozoic peneplain that once covered southern Ghana, and contains ancient bauxitic soils.  The range is the site of an important forest reserve, and the source of three major rivers.

Forest Reserve

A large area of the range has been declared a forest reserve, including about 17,400 hectares of upland evergreen forest, rare for Ghana.  The reserve is managed by the Forestry Commission of Ghana in collaboration with other stakeholders, key among them is the Okyeman Environment Foundation, which has restricted people from farming in the area and instead is trying to encourage eco-tourism. However, the reserve is under pressure from logging and hunting for bushmeat. It is also vulnerable to mining exploration activities, since the reserve contains gold deposits as well as low-grade bauxite.

Many of the plant species occur only in this part of Ghana, or in few other localities and part was declared as a specially protected GSBA (Globally Significant Biodiversity Area) following  a national botanic survey of forest reserves by Ghana Forestry Dept. in the 1990s. The forest reserve contains many birds that are rare elsewhere in Ghana including Olive Long-tailed Cuckoo, Rufous-sided Broadbill, Least Honeyguide, Spotted Honeyguide, Common Bristlebill and Blue-headed Crested-Flycatcher. In a 2006 expedition to survey the reserve, scientists discovered two rare and possibly endangered species of primate in the reserve: Geoffroy's pied colobus (Colobus vellerosus) and the olive colobus (Procolobus verus), as well as 17 rare butterfly species and the critically endangered frog species Conraua derooi. Butterfly species include the Papilio antimachus, which has the widest wingspan in the world and the Mylothris atewa, which may be globally critically endangered.

As of 2016, there is an ongoing campaign to promote Atewa to national park status.

Rivers
The Atewa range is the source of three important rivers: the Ayensu and Densu Rivers which flow south into the Atlantic, and the Birim which makes a long detour north and southwest around the Atewa range before joining the Pra River. The Birim, which flows through all the three of the traditional Akyem areas of Ghana, is an important but declining source of diamonds.

References

External links
 

Mountains of Ghana
National parks of Ghana
Forest reserves of Ghana